Ingham is a surname. Notable people with the surname include:

 Albert Ingham (1900–1967), British mathematician
 Alice Ingham (1830–1890), Roman Catholic nun and missionary.
 Barrie Ingham (1932–2015), British actor
 Benjamin Ingham (1712–1772), English Methodist missionary
 Bernard Ingham (born 1932), British journalist and former press secretary to Margaret Thatcher
 Beryl Ingham (1901–1960), British dancer and actor, wife of George Formby
 Charles C. Ingham (died 1863), Irish artist
 Craig Ingham (born 1965), New Zealand cricketer
 Dane Ingham (born 1999), New Zealand association football player
 Elaine Ingham, American microbiologist and soil biology researcher
 Eric Ingham (1944–2017), English rugby league footballer
 Harry Ingham (1882 – after 1915), English footballer
 Jai Ingham (born 1993), New Zealand footballer
 Jane Ingham (1897–1982), English botanist and scientific translator
 John H. Ingham (1928–2003), Australian businessman, racehorse owner and breeder
 Mary Bigelow Ingham (1832–1923), American writer and educator
 Michael Ingham (bishop) (brn 1949), Canadian Anglican bishop
 Michael Ingham (cricketer) (born 1957), English cricketer
 Michael Ingham (footballer) (born 1980), Northern Irish footballer
 Mike Ingham (born 1950), British broadcaster
 Nathan Ingham (born 1993), Canadian soccer player
 Oliver Ingham (1287–1344), English knight and administrator
 Robert Ingham (1793–1875), British barrister and politician
 Samuel Ingham (1793–1881), American politician
 Samuel D. Ingham (1779–1860), American politician
 William Ingham (1882 – after 1915), English footballer

English-language surnames
English toponymic surnames